Maromandray is a rural commune in Madagascar. It belongs to the district of Mandoto, which is a part of Vakinankaratra Region.

References 

Populated places in Vakinankaratra